Liyeh Chak may refer to:
 Liyeh Chak, Pir Kuh